
Rens is a Dutch masculine given name – a short form of Laurentius or Emerentius – as well as a patronymic surname derived from it. Among variant forms of the surname are Rense, Rensen and Renssen. People with this name include:

Given name
Rens Blom (born 1977), Dutch pole vaulter
Rens van Eijden (born 1988), Dutch football defender

Surname
Els Rens (born 1983), Belgian long-distance runner
Frans Rens (1805–1874), Flemish writer
Hilde Rens (1972–2009), Belgian singer known by her stage name  Yasmine
Madame Rens (1789–1873), Flemish-born New South Wales settler and businesswoman

Rense
Arthur Rense (1917—1990), American sports journalist 
Jeff Rense, American conspiracy theorist and radio talk-show host
Paige Rense (born 1928), American magazine editor, wife of Arthur Rense
Rip Rense (born 1954), American music and film journalist and music producer
Rensen
Ralph Rensen (1933–1961), English Grand Prix motorcycle road racer
Raymond Rensen (born 1979), Dutch rapper known as Raymzter

See also
Dayton Rens, New York Rens and Pittsburgh Rens, American basketball teams

References

Dutch masculine given names
Dutch-language surnames
Patronymic surnames